Mashkovskaya is a rural locality (a village) in Morozovskoye Rural Settlement, Verkhovazhsky District, Vologda Oblast, Russia. The population was 21 as of 2002.

Geography 
Mashkovskaya is located 28 km northwest of Verkhovazhye (the district's administrative centre) by road. Mininskaya is the nearest rural locality.

References 

Rural localities in Verkhovazhsky District